Luis Bestit (born 23 July 1945) is a Spanish water polo player. He competed at the 1968 Summer Olympics and the 1972 Summer Olympics.

See also
 Spain men's Olympic water polo team records and statistics
 List of men's Olympic water polo tournament goalkeepers

References

External links
 

1945 births
Living people
Water polo players from Barcelona
Spanish male water polo players
Water polo goalkeepers
Olympic water polo players of Spain
Water polo players at the 1968 Summer Olympics
Water polo players at the 1972 Summer Olympics
20th-century Spanish people